The UK Chess Challenge is an annual four-stage chess competition for school-age children from the United Kingdom. Michael Basman is credited with creating the original challenge back in 1996 and is still closely connected with the competition. The director of the tournament is Sarah Longson (née Hegarty) supported by her husband Alex Longson. Longson is former British Ladies Chess Champion and represents England at Olympiads.  
Over 40,000 children play in the competition at the school stage and the eventual winner wins £2,000 and is crowned as UK Schools' Chess Challenge Champion. The competition is sponsored by Delancey.

Stages

School
The first stage involves school chess clubs holding a qualifying competition to determine the strongest player for each gender-year combination, e.g. U-11 boys, U-9 girls. Each such player qualifies to enter the county Megafinal competition. For schools without chess clubs, there are alternative competitions called Last Chance Saloons that will also enable qualification to the Megafinal.

Megafinal
A one-day Megafinal is held within most UK counties to determine the strongest player from the county or local area within each gender and year combination. Each such player is titled Supremo (boys) or Suprema (girls). The top player plus all those scoring 3.5/6 or better qualify for the Gigafinal.

Gigafinal
There are usually 3 one-day Gigafinals - one for Northern counties; one for Southern counties and one for the Midlands . As with the Megafinal, each Gigafinal is held to determine the strongest player for the qualifying region within each gender / year combination. Each such player is titled Ultimo (boys) or Ultima (girls). The Ultimo / Ultima players from each Gigafinal qualify to enter the Terafinal Champions competition. Until 2002, the two runners-up in each category qualified to enter the Terafinal Challengers competition. Currently ( in 2019 ) anyone scoring 4 or above qualified for the challengers .

Terafinal
There is 1 final Terafinal competition - The Ultimo's and Ultima's in each age group (including those who were tied on the same score in first place) play in one of the 5 sections depending on age. A contestant can move up to an older age group on request.  The sections are: U8, U10, U12, U14 and U18. There are trophies, medals and money given out as prizes depending on the age group.

Challengers

At the moment this event has 5 age groups the same as the terafinal. The best player in the section goes through to the terafinal. Any players tied on the same score which is the highest also go through. There are two of these events : Northern and Southern.

List of winners for the oldest age group
{| class="sortable wikitable" 
! Year !! Winner
|-
| 1997 || Richard Cleveland
|-
| 1998 || Adam Hunt
|-
| 1999 || Thomas Rendle
|-
| 2000 || Lorin D'Costa
|-
| 2001 || Lorin D'Costa
|-
| 2002 || Lorin D'Costa
|-
| 2003 || Lorin D'Costa
|-
| 2004 || Ben Purton
|-
| 2005 || Stephen Gordon
|-
| 2006 || James Hanley
|-
| 2007 || Peter Poobalasingam
|-
| 2008 || Peter Poobalasingam
|-
| 2009 || Felix Ynojosa (cat, es)
|-
| 2010 || Felix Ynojosa (cat, es)
|-
| 2011 || Yang-Fan Zhou
|-
| 2012 || Brandon Clarke
|-
| 2013 || Marcus Harvey
|-
| 2014 || Marcus Harvey
|-
| 2015 || Matthew Wadsworth
|-
| 2016 || Joseph McPhillips
|-
| 2017 || Harry Grieve
|-
| 2018 || Koby Kalavannan
|-
| 2019 || Koby Kalavannan
|}

External links
New 2011 Website 
http://www.delanceyukschoolschesschallenge.com/

Chess competitions
Chess in the United Kingdom
Educational projects